France was the first ally of the new United States in 1778. The 1778 Treaty of Alliance between the two countries and the subsequent aid provided from France proved decisive in the American victory over Britain in the American Revolutionary War. France, however, was left heavily indebted after the war, which contributed to France's own revolution and eventual transition to a republic.

The France-United States alliance has remained peaceful since, with the exceptions of the Quasi War from 1798 to 1799 and American combat against Vichy France (while supporting Free France) from 1942 to 1944 during World War II. Tensions, however, rose during the American Civil War, as France intervened militarily in Mexico and entertained the possibility of recognizing the separatist Confederate States of America, the defeat of which was followed by the United States sending a large army to the Mexican border and forcing the withdraw of French forces from Mexico.

In the 21st century, differences over the Iraq War led to a souring of public opinion on both sides of the relationship. However, relations improved over the decade after the beginning of the war, with American favorability ratings of France reaching a historic high of 87% in 2016. Gallup concluded, "After diplomatic differences in 2003 soured relations between the two countries, France and the U.S. have found a common interest in combating international terrorism, and the mission has become personal for both countries."

However, relations again deteriorated in September 2021 due to fallout from the AUKUS agreement between the United States, the United Kingdom, and Australia. Philippe Étienne, the French ambassador, was recalled as a result of the fallout; no French ambassador to the United States has ever previously been recalled. The French Foreign Ministry cited as reasons the "duplicity, disdain and lies" of Australia and the United States. However relations improved sharply in early 2022, as Paris worked closely with the U.S. and NATO in helping Ukraine and punishing Russia for its invasion. Overall relations with the U.S. became an issue in the April 2022 presidential election, as right-wing candidate Marine Le Pen denounced close ties with the United States and NATO while promising a rapprochement with Russia.

Colonial era

New France was the area colonized by France beginning with exploration in 1534 and ending with the cession of New France to Great Britain and Spain in 1763 under the Treaty of Paris (1763).

The vast territory of New France consisted of five colonies at its peak in 1712, each with its own administration: Canada, the most developed colony, was divided into the districts of Québec, Trois-Rivières, and Montréal; Hudson's Bay; Acadie in the northeast; Plaisance on the island of Newfoundland; and Louisiane. It extended from Newfoundland to the Canadian Prairies and from Hudson Bay to the Gulf of Mexico, including all the Great Lakes of North America.  The colony of Louisiana (New France) became part of the United States between 1776 and 1803, but outside of what is now the state of Louisiana it had a very small French population.

Population grew steadily because of high birth rates and good food supplies. In 1754 New France's population consisted of 10,000 Acadians, 55,000 Canadiens, while the territories of upper and lower Louisiana had about 4,000 permanent French settlers, summing to 69,000 people.

The British expelled the Acadians in the Great Upheaval from 1755 to 1764. Their descendants are dispersed in modern Canada and in the U.S., in Maine and Louisiana.

French and Indian wars
Beginning in earnest after 1688, the simmering dynastic, religious and factional rivalries between the Protestant Britain and the larger power Catholic France  triggered four wars in Europe that spilled over into North America. They were  "French and Indian Wars" fought largely on American soil (King William's War, 1689–1697; Queen Anne's War, 1702–1713; King George's War, 1744–1748; and, finally the Seven Years' War, 1756–1763). The French made allies of most of the Indian tribes and enabled them to attack villages in New England.  Great Britain  won and finally removed the French from continental North America in 1763.

In 1763, France ceded almost all of New France to Britain and Spain, at the Treaty of Paris. Britain took over Canada, Acadia, and the parts of French Louisiana which lay east of the Mississippi River, except for the Île d'Orléans. Spain was granted all the French claims to the west of the Mississippi River. In 1800, Spain returned its portion of Louisiana to France under the secret Treaty of San Ildefonso in 1800 imposed by Napoleon Bonaparte. He sold it all to the United States in the Louisiana Purchase of 1803, permanently ending French colonial efforts on the American mainland. New France became absorbed within the United States and Canada. In the United States, the legacy of New France includes numerous place names as well as pockets of French-speaking communities.

France and the American Revolution 

Within a decade after the French were expelled in 1763, the British colonies were in open revolt. France, coordinated by Luis de Unzaga y Amézaga 'le Conciliateur', retaliated by secretly supplying the independence movement with troops and war materials.

After Congress declared independence in July 1776, its agents in Paris recruited officers for the Continental Army, notably the Marquis de Lafayette, who served with distinction as a major general. Despite a lingering distrust of France, the agents also requested a formal alliance. After readying their fleet and being impressed by the U.S. victory at the Battle of Saratoga in October 1777, the French on February 6, 1778, concluded treaties of commerce and alliance that bound them to fight Britain until independence of the United States was assured.

The military alliance began poorly. French Admiral d'Estaing sailed to North America with a fleet in 1778, and began a joint effort with American General John Sullivan to capture a British outpost at Newport, Rhode Island. D'Estaing broke off the operation to confront a British fleet, and then, despite pleas from Sullivan and Lafayette, sailed away to Boston for repairs. Without naval support, the plan collapsed, and American forces under Sullivan had to conduct a fighting retreat alone. American outrage was widespread, and several Royal French Navy sailors were killed in anti-French riots. D'Estaing's actions in a disastrous siege at Savannah, Georgia further undermined Franco-American relations.

The alliance improved with the arrival in the United States in 1780 of the Comte de Rochambeau, who maintained a good working relationship with General Washington. French naval actions at the Battle of the Chesapeake made possible the decisive Franco–American victory at the siege of Yorktown in October 1781, which effectively brought an end to major combat in North America.

The reliance of the nascent United States on Catholic France for military, financial and diplomatic aid led to a sharp drop in anti-Catholic rhetoric. Historian Francis Cogiano argues, the king replaced the pope as the targeted common enemy.  Though Anti-Catholicism remained strong among those Loyalists who chose to remain in the new nation, by the 1780s legal toleration had been codified for Catholics across the United States, including all of the New England, a region that had historically been so hostile. Cogliano wrote: "In the midst of war and crisis, New Englanders gave up not only their allegiance to Britain but one of their most dearly held prejudices."

Peace treaty

In the peace negotiations between the Americans and the British in Paris in 1782, the French played a major role. Indeed, the French Foreign Minister Vergennes had maneuvered so that the American Congress ordered its delegation to follow the advice of the French. However, the American commissioners, Benjamin Franklin, John Adams, and particularly John Jay, correctly realized that France did not want a strong United States. They realized that they would get better terms directly from Britain itself. The key episodes came in September, 1782, when Vergennes proposed a solution that was strongly opposed by the United States. France was exhausted by the war, and everyone wanted peace except Spain, which insisted on continuing the war until it captured Gibraltar from the British. Vergennes came up with the deal that Spain would accept instead of Gibraltar. The United States would gain its independence but be confined to the area east of the Appalachian Mountains. Britain would take the area north of the Ohio River. In the area south of that there would be set up an independent Indian state under Spanish control. It would be an Indian barrier state and keep the Americans from the Mississippi River or New Orleans, which were under Spanish control. John Jay promptly told the British that he was willing to negotiate directly with them, cutting off France and Spain. The British Prime Minister Lord Shelburne agreed. He was in full charge of the British negotiations and he now saw a chance to split the United States away from France and make the new country a valuable economic partner. The western terms were that the United States would gain all of the area east of the Mississippi River, north of Florida, and south of Canada. The northern boundary would be almost the same as today. The United States would gain fishing rights off Canadian coasts, and agreed to allow British merchants and Loyalists to try to recover their property. It was a highly favorable treaty for the United States, and deliberately so from the British point of view. Prime Minister Shelburne foresaw highly profitable two-way trade between Britain and the rapidly growing United States, as it indeed came to pass.  Trade with France was always on a much smaller scale.

The French Revolution 

Six years later, the French Revolution toppled the Bourbon regime. At first, the United States was quite sympathetic to the new situation in France, where the absolutist hereditary monarchy was replaced by a constitutional republic. However, the situation in France increasingly soured and the French revolutionary government became increasingly authoritarian and brutal. Events such as the reign of terror, dissipated some of the United States' warmth for France. Unlike Thomas Jefferson, who left France in 1789, Gouverneur Morris (1752–1816) was far more critical of the French Revolution. Commenting on her grandfather's conservative outlook on the world, Anne Cary Morris said, "His creed was rather to form the government to suit the condition, character, manners, and habits of the people. In France this opinion led him to take the monarchical view, firmly believing that a republican form of government would not suit the French character."

A crisis emerged in 1793 when France was invaded on multiple sides by Great Britain and its allies, after the revolutionary government had executed the king. The young federal government in the United States was uncertain how to respond with some arguing that the US was still obliged by the alliance of 1778 to go to war on the side of France. The treaty had been called "military and economic", and as the United States had not finished paying off the French war loan, the continued validity of the military alliance was also called into question.  President George Washington (responding to advice from both Alexander Hamilton and Jefferson) recognized the new French government, but did not support France in its war with Britain, as expressed in his 1793 Proclamation of Neutrality. Congress agreed and a year later passed a neutrality act forbidding U.S. citizens from participating in the war and prohibiting the use of U.S. soil as a base of operations by either side in the conflict. The French revolutionary government viewed Washington's policy as a betrayal.

The first challenge to U.S. neutrality came from France, when its first diplomatic representative, the brash Edmond-Charles Genêt, toured the United States to organize U.S. expeditions against Spain and Britain. Washington demanded Genêt's recall, but by then the French Revolution had taken yet another turn and the new French ministers arrived to arrest Genêt. Washington refused to extradite Genêt (knowing he would be guillotined), and Genêt later became a U.S. citizen.

France further regarded Jay's Treaty (November 1794) between Britain and the United States as hostile.  It opened a decade of trade when France was at war with Britain.

Timothy Pickering (1745-1829) was the third United States Secretary of State, serving in that office from 1795 to 1800 under Washington and John Adams.  Biographer Gerald Clarfield says he was a "quick-tempered, self-righteous, frank, and aggressive Anglophile," who handled the French poorly. In response the French envoy Pierre Adet repeatedly provoked Pickering into embarrassing situations, then ridiculed his blunderings and blusterings to appeal to Democratic-Republican opponents of the Federalist Adams Administration.

Undeclared naval fighting: Quasi War (1798–1800)

To overcome this resentment John Adams sent a special mission to Paris in 1797 to meet the French foreign minister Talleyrand. The American delegation was shocked, however, when it was demanded that they pay monetary bribes in order to meet and secure a deal with the French government. Adams exposed the episode, known as the "XYZ Affair", which greatly offended Americans even though such bribery was not uncommon among the courts of Europe.

Tensions with France escalated into an undeclared war—called the "Quasi-War." It involved two years of hostilities at sea, in which both navies attacked the other's shipping in the West Indies. The unexpected fighting ability of the U.S. Navy, which destroyed the French West Indian trade, together with the growing weaknesses and final overthrow of the ruling Directory in France in the Coup of 18 Brumaire, led Talleyrand to reopen negotiations. At the same time, President Adams feuded with Hamilton over control of the Adams' administration.  Adams took sudden and unexpected action, rejecting the anti-French hawks in his own party and offering peace to France. In 1800 he sent William Vans Murray to France to negotiate peace; Federalists cried betrayal. The subsequent negotiations, embodied in the Convention of 1800 (also called the "Treaty of Mortefontaine") of September 30, 1800, affirmed the rights of Americans as neutrals upon the sea and abrogated the alliance with France of 1778. The treaty failed to provide compensation for the $20,000,000 "French Spoliation Claims" of the United States; the U.S. government eventually paid these claims. The Convention of 1800 ensured that the United States would remain neutral toward France in the wars of Napoleon and ended the "entangling" French alliance with the United States. In truth, this alliance had only been viable between 1778 and 1783.

Napoleon

The Spanish Empire was losing money heavily on the ownership of vast Louisiana territory, and was eager to turn it over to Napoleon in 1800. He envisioned it as the base (along with Haiti) of a New World empire. Louisiana would be a granary providing food to the enslaved labor force in the West Indies. President Jefferson could tolerate weak Spain but not the powerful First French Empire in the west. He considered war to prevent French control of the Mississippi River. Jefferson sent his close friend, James Monroe, to France to buy as much of the land around New Orleans as he could. Surprisingly, Napoleon agreed to sell the entire territory. Because of an insuppressible slave rebellion in St. Domingue, modern-day Haiti, among other reasons, Bonaparte's North American plans collapsed. To keep Louisiana out of British hands in an approaching war he sold it in April 1803 to the United States for $15 million.  British bankers financed the deal, taking American government bonds and shipping gold to Paris. The size of the United States was doubled without going to war.

Britain and France resumed their war in 1803, just after the Louisiana Purchase. Both challenged American neutrality and tried to disrupt American trade with its enemy. The presupposition was that small neutral nations could benefit from the wars of the great powers. Jefferson distrusted both Napoleon and Great Britain, but saw Britain (with its monarchism, aristocracy and great navy and position in Canada) as the more immediate threat to American interests. Therefore, he and Madison took a generally pro-French position and used the embargo to hurt British trade. Both sides infringed on U.S. maritime rights but the British did so far more, kidnapping thousands of American sailors off U.S. ships on the high seas and impressing them into the Royal Navy.  Jefferson signed the Embargo Act in 1807, which forbade all foreign trade, exports and imports. Though designed to hurt the British, American commerce harmed far more and was rescinded in 1809, as Jefferson left office. The new Madison administration chose a more direct approach against British aggression and in 1812 declared war on Britain. Despite both nations now in open war against Great Britain, throughout the War of 1812 there never existed either a formal or informal sense of renewed alliance between the U.S. and France and no direct effort was ever made to coordinate military activity.

With the Louisiana purchase the U.S. inherited French claims to Texas and border disputes with Spain's adjacent colonial empire. These issues were resolved by the Adams–Onís Treaty in 1819 which helped pave the way for the U.S. purchase of Florida.

Alienation
Catherine Hebert reports that French visitors before 1790 made highly favorable reports of American culture, influenced perhaps by the ideals of the noble savage and the American acceptance of the Enlightenment. However the Royalist exiles who came in the 1790s responded in a highly negative fashion to republicanism, and few remained permanently.

According to James Banner, conservative Americans reacted strongly against the French Revolution, with its disdain toward religion and its zest for the guillotine. American minister James Monroe managed to rescue Thomas Paine from the guillotine in Paris in 1794. Jeffersonians at first supported the French Revolution, but after Napoleon came to power in 1799 Jefferson and his followers repudiated it as the antithesis of republicanism. The result was the destruction of the 1778 alliance and indeed the friendship between the United States and France. The new hostility enhanced the conservative elements in American republicanism. The alienation increased American sensibility about being "a people apart" and strengthened distrust of foreign influences and rejection of alien ideologies.

1815–1860

Relations between the two nations were generally quiet for two decades with both trade and migration staying low. The United States, issued the "Monroe Doctrine" in 1823 to keep European powers, such as France, from colonizing lands in the New World. France had a strong interest in expanding commercially and imperially into Latin America as Spanish hegemony there collapsed. There was a desire among top French officials that some of the newly independent countries in Latin America might select a Bourbon king, though no actual operations ever took place. French officials ignored the American position. France and Austria, two reactionary monarchies, strenuously opposed American republicanism and wanted the United States to have no voice whatsoever in their affairs.

A treaty between the United States and France in 1831 called for France to pay 25 million francs for the spoliation claims of American shipowners against French seizures during the Napoleonic wars. France did pay European claims, but refused to pay the United States.  President Andrew Jackson was livid, In 1834 ordered the U.S. Navy to stand by and asked Congress for legislation. Jackson's political opponents blocked any legislation. France was annoyed but finally voted the money in exchanged for the an apology-which Jackson refused, and diplomatic relations were broken off until in December 1835 when Jackson offered some friendlier words. Eventually through British mediation, France paid the money, and cordial relations were resumed.

Modest cultural exchanges resumed, most famously an intense study visits by Gustave de Beaumont and Alexis de Tocqueville, the author of Democracy in America (1835). The book was immediately a popular success in both countries, and to this day helps shape American self-understanding. American writers such as James Fenimore Cooper, Harriet Beecher Stowe, and Ralph Waldo Emerson appealed to an appreciative French audience. French utopian socialists projected an idealized American society as a model for the future. French travelers to the United States were often welcomed in the name of the Marquis de Lafayette, who despite having lost much of his influence in France, remained a popular hero in the Revolution in US and made a triumphant American tour in 1824.  Numerous political exiles found refuge in New York.

In the 1840s Britain and France considered sponsoring continued independence of the Republic of Texas and blocking U.S. moves to obtain California. Balance of power considerations made Britain want to keep the western territories out of U.S. hands to limit U.S. power; in the end, France opposed such intervention in order to limit British power, the same reason for which France had sold Louisiana to the U.S. and earlier supported the American Revolution. Thus the great majority of the territorial growth of the continental United States was accepted without question by Paris.

Civil War: Neutrality and Mexico

During the American Civil War, 1861–65, France was neutral, as was every other nation. However  Napoleon III favored the CSA, hoping to weaken the United States, gain a new ally in the Confederacy, safeguard the cotton trade and protect his large investment in controlling the Second Mexican Empire. France was too weak to act alone and sought the support of the British who also favored the Confederacy but were ultimately unwilling to risk war with the U.S.

Napoleon III took advantage of the war in 1863, when he installed Austrian archduke Maximilian of Habsburg on the Mexican throne. Washington protested and refused to recognize the new government. Napoleon hoped that a Confederate victory would allow French dominance over Mexico. Matías Romero, Júarez's ambassador to the United States, gained some support in Congress for possibly intervening on Mexico's behalf against France's occupation.  Seeking to avoid war with France, Secretary of State William Seward cautiously limited aid to the Mexican rebels until the Confederacy was near defeat.

By 1865, United States diplomatic pressure coupled with the massing of US soldiers on the border with Mexico, persuaded Napoleon III to withdraw French troops and support. The democratic Mexican government was soon restored and Maximilian executed.

After the assassination of Abraham Lincoln in April 1865, an outpouring of sympathy from French citizens proceeded. A nationwide collection for a medal, expressing the people's sympathy for Lincoln's death, was taken.

The Union victory, French withdrawal from Mexico, and the Russian sale of Alaska left the United States dominant in the Western Hemisphere.

1867–1914

The removal of Napoleon III in 1870 after the Franco-Prussian War helped improve Franco–American relations.  American public opinion favored a German victory. During the German Siege of Paris, the small American population, led by the Minister to France Elihu B. Washburne, provided much medical, humanitarian, and diplomatic support to Parisians, gaining much credit to the Americans. In subsequent years the balance of power in the relationship shifted as the United States, with its very rapid growth in wealth, industry and population, came to overshadow the old powers.  Trade was at a low level, France minimized the activity of American banks and insurance companies, tariffs were high, and mutual investments were uncommon.

All during this period, the relationship remained friendly—as symbolized by the Statue of Liberty, presented in 1884 as a gift to the United States from the French people. From 1870 until 1918, France was the only major republic in a Europe of monarchies, which endeared it to the United States. Few French people emigrated, but many held the United States in high esteem, as a land of opportunity and as a source of modern ideas. Intellectuals, however, saw the United States as a land built on crass materialism, lacking in a significant culture, and boasting of its distrust of intellectuals. Very few self-styled French intellectuals were admirers.

In 1906, when Germany challenged French influence in Morocco (see Tangier Crisis and Agadir Crisis), President Theodore Roosevelt sided with the French.  Nevertheless, as the U.S. grew mightily in economic power, and forged closer ties with Britain, the French increasingly talked about an Anglo-Saxon threat to their culture.

Student exchange became an important factor, especially Americans going to France to study. The French were annoyed that so many Americans were going to Germany for post-graduate education, and discussed how to attract more Americans. After 1870, hundreds of American women traveled to France and Switzerland to obtain their medical degrees. The best American schools were closed to them and chose an expensive option superior to what they were allowed in the U.S.  In the First World War, normal enrollments plunged at French universities, and the government made a deliberate decision to attract American students partially to fill the enrollment gap, and more importantly to neutralize German influences in American higher education. Thousands of American soldiers, waiting for their slow return to America after the war ended in late 1918, enrolled in university programs set up especially for them.

World War I (1914–19)

When World War I broke out the United States declared itself neutral, a status is maintained for almost 3 years until entering the conflict in April 1917 on the side of the Allies. Both before and after Washington provided much-needed money—as loans to be repaid—that purchased American food, oil and chemicals for the French effort. The first wave of initial American soldiers to arrive at the Western Front brought no heavy equipment (so that the ships could carry more soldiers). In combat they used French artillery, airplanes and tanks, such as the SPAD XIII fighter biplane and Renault FT light tank serving in the aviation and armored formations of the American Expeditionary Force on the Western Front. In 1918 the United States sent over two million combat troops under the command of General John J. Pershing, who operated on their own sector of the Western Front. They gave the Allies a decisive edge, as the Germans were unable to replace their heavy losses and virtually collapsed by September 1918.

The peace settlement (1919)
President Woodrow Wilson had become the hero of the war for Frenchmen, and his arrival in Paris was widely hailed. However, the two countries clashed over France's policy to weaken Germany and make it pay for the entire French war. The burning ambition of French Premier Georges Clemenceau was to ensure the security of France in the future; his formula was not friendship with Germany but restitution, reparations, and guarantees. Clemenceau had little confidence in what he considered to be the unrealistic and utopian principles of Wilson: "Even God was satisfied with Ten Commandments, but Wilson insists on fourteen" (a reference to Wilson's "Fourteen Points"). The two nations disagreed on debts, reparations, and restraints on Germany. President Wilson along with Clemenceau and British Prime Minister David Lloyd George led in making major decisions at the conference. Wilson made the new League of Nations his highest priority; the other two went along but had much less confidence in the value of the new League.

Clemenceau was also determined that a buffer state should be established in the Rhineland under the aegis of France. In the eyes of the U.S. and British representatives, such a crass violation of the principle of self-determination would only breed future wars, and a compromise was therefore offered Clemenceau, which he accepted. The territory in question was to be occupied by Allied troops for a period of five to fifteen years, and a zone extending fifty kilometers east of the Rhine was to be demilitarized. Wilson and Lloyd George agreed to support a treaty that would guarantee France against German aggression. Republican leaders in Washington were willing to support a security treaty with France. It never came to a Senate vote because Wilson insisted on linking it to the Versailles Treaty, which the Republicans would not accept without certain amendments Wilson refused to allow.

French historian Duroselle portrays Clemenceau as wiser than Wilson, equally compassionate and committed to justice but one who understood that world peace and order depended on the permanent suppression of the German threat. Blumenthal (1986), by contrast, says Wilson's policies were far sounder than the harsh terms demanded by Clemenceau. Blumenthal agrees with Wilson that peace and prosperity required Germany's integration into the world economy and political community as an equal partner.

Interwar years (1919–38) 

During the interwar years, the two nations remained friendly. Beginning in the 1920s, U.S. intellectuals, painters, writers, and tourists were drawn to visit and because of their interest in  French art, literature, fashion, wines, and cuisine.  Tensions rose over Washington's insistence that Paris repay war loans. A deal was reached: the Dawes Plan where American banks made loans to Germany, enabling them to pay reparations to France, who in turn would cover their American war loans. This system collapsed with in the Great Depression however.

A number of American artists, such as Josephine Baker, experienced popular success in France. Paris was quite welcoming to American jazz music and black artists in particular, as France, unlike a significant part of the United States at the time, had no racial discrimination laws. Numerous writers such as William Faulkner, F. Scott Fitzgerald, Ernest Hemingway, and others were deeply influenced by their experiences of French life.  Known as the Lost Generation, their time in Paris was documented by Hemingway in his memoir A Moveable Feast.

However, anti-Americanism came of age in the 1920s, as many French traditionalists were alarmed at the power of Hollywood and warned that America represented modernity, which in turn threatened traditional French values, customs, and popular literature. The alarm of American influence escalated half a century later when Americans opened the $4 billion Disneyland Paris theme park in 1992; it attracted larger crowds than the Louvre, and soon it was said that the iconic American cartoon character Mickey Mouse had become more familiar than Asterix among French youth.

The J. Walter Thompson Company of New York was the leading American advertising agency of the interwar years. It established branch offices in Europe, including one in Paris in 1927. Most of these branches were soon the leading local agencies, as in Britain and Germany, JWT-Paris did poorly from the late 1920s through the early 1960s. The causes included cultural clashes between the French and Americans and subtle anti-Americanism among potential clients. Furthermore, The French market was heavily regulated and protected to repel all foreign interests, and the American admen in Paris were purportedly not good at hiding their condescension and insensitivity.

In 1928 the two nations were the chief sponsors of the Kellogg–Briand Pact. The pact, which was endorsed by most major nations, renounced the use of war, promoted peaceful settlement of disputes, and called for collective force to prevent aggression. Its provisions were incorporated into the United Nations Charter and other treaties and it became a stepping stone to a more activist American policy. Diplomatic intercourse was minimal under Franklin D. Roosevelt from 1933 to 1939.

World War II (1938–45)

In the approach to Second World War the United States helped France arm its air force against the Nazi threat. The sudden outbreak of war had forced France to realize that Germany had a larger more advanced Air Force. President Roosevelt had long been interested in France, and was a personal friend of French Senator, Baron Amaury de La Grange. In late 1937 he told Roosevelt about the French weaknesses, and asked for military help. Roosevelt was forthcoming, and forced the War Department to secretly sell the most modern American airplanes and other equipment to France. The U.S. military opposed the sale of their latest designs, and American factories needed time to ramp up production. Fewer than 200 U.S. warplanes could be delivered before France surrendered in 1940. Paris frantically expanded its own aircraft production, but it was too little and too late. France and Britain declared war on Germany when it invaded Poland in September 1939, but there was little action until the following spring. The German blitzkrieg overwhelmed Denmark and Norway and trapped French and British forces in Belgium. France chose to accept German surrender terms which included a fascist puppet dictatorship.

Vichy France (1940–44)
Langer (1947) argues that Washington was shocked by the sudden collapse of France in spring 1940, and feared that Germany might gain control of the large French fleet, and exploit France's overseas colonies. This led the Roosevelt administration to maintain diplomatic relations. FDR appointed his close associate Admiral William D. Leahy as ambassador. The Vichy regime was officially neutral but in practice subservient to the Axis. The United States severed diplomatic relations in late 1942 after Germany took direct control of the areas Vichy had previously governed autonomously.

Free French Forces
Relations were strained between Roosevelt and Charles de Gaulle, the leader of the Free French. After the breakout at Normandy, most on both sides thought it was only a matter of time before the Nazis lost. Eisenhower did give de Gaulle his word that Paris could be formally liberated by French forces, given the city's heavy symbolic but lack of tactical value. It was therefore easy for Eisenhower to let de Gaulle's French Forces of the Interior take the charge. Hitler had given the order to bomb and burn Paris to the ground; he wanted to make it a second Stalingrad. The French 2nd armored division with Maj. General Phillipe Leclerc at its helm was granted the task of liberating Paris by the Allied Supreme Command. General Leclerc was ecstatic at this thought because he wanted to wipe away the humiliation of the Vichy Government.

Leclerc did not respect his American counterparts because like the British he thought that they were new to the war. Therefore, he thought the Americans did not know what they were doing on the field. After being more trouble than help, George S. Patton let Leclerc go for Paris. The French Resistance then fought to liberate Paris from the east while the 4th U.S. Infantry (originally part of Patton's Army) came from the west. Though the contribution of French Forces was of little significance militarily, Eisenhower still agreed with de Gaulle, that the first allied soldiers to enter a liberated Paris be French.

With no other viable alternatives, the other Allied leaders accepted De Gaulle as head of the new French state, Eisenhower even came to Paris to give De Gaulle his blessing in person. Meanwhile, the U.S. Third Army under General Patton continued to push the German Army from the country, first sweeping across northern France before going onto liberating Lorraine, where he annexed Leclerc's division into his army.

Roosevelt opposes French colonies in Asia
Roosevelt was strongly committed to terminating European colonialism in Asia, including French Indochina and placing them under international trusteeship. Roosevelt offered post-war funding and diplomatic support to the Republic of China to stabilize and if necessary police the region. This scheme included Chinese occupation of French Indochina, a proposal that was directly contrary to the plans of the French; de Gaulle had a grand vision of the French overseas empire as the base for his return to defeat Vichy France. Roosevelt would not abide de Gaulle, but Winston Churchill, a staunch supporter of colonialism himself, realized that Britain needed French help to reestablish its position in Europe after the war. Churchill and the British foreign office worked with de Gaulle against Roosevelt's decolonization plans. By 1944, Chiang's government was barely hanging on; despite Roosevelt's faith in the Chinese they had proven to be weak, often unstable and strategically vulnerable ally. Moreover, Chiang continued to voice disinterest to Roosevelt in his trusteeship plan and the idea was dropped altogether by the end of the war.

Postwar years 
In the postwar years, both cooperation and discord persisted. The French zone of occupation in Germany was formed from the U.S. zone. After de Gaulle left office in January 1946, the logjam was broken in terms of financial aid.  Lend Lease had barely restarted when it was unexpectedly ended in August 1945. The U.S.  Army shipped in food, 1944–46. U.S. Treasury loans and cash grants were given in 1945–47, and especially the Marshall Plan gave large sums (1948–51). There was post-Marshall aid (1951–55) designed to help France rearm and provide massive support for its war in Indochina. Apart from low-interest loans, the other funds were grants that did not involve repayment.  The debts left over from World War I, whose payment had been suspended since 1931, was renegotiated in the Blum-Byrnes agreement of 1946. The United States forgave all $2.8 billion in debt from the First World War, and gave France a new loan of $650 million. In return French negotiator Jean Monnet set out the French five-year plan for recovery and development. The Marshall Plan gave France $2.3 billion with no repayment. The total of all American grants and credits to France from 1946 to 1953, amounted to $4.9 billion.  A central feature of the Marshall Plan was to encourage international trade, reduce tariffs, lower barriers, and modernize French management. The Marshall Plan set up intensive tours of American industry.  France sent 500 missions with 4700 businessmen and experts to tour American factories, farms, stores and offices.  They were especially impressed with the prosperity of American workers, and how they could purchase an inexpensive new automobile for nine months work, compared to 30 months in France. Some French businesses resisted Americanization, but the most profitable, especially chemicals, oil, electronics, and instrumentation, seized upon the opportunity to attract American investments and build a larger market. The U.S. insisted on opportunities for Hollywood films, and the French film industry responded with new life.

Cold War
In 1949 the two became formal allies through the North Atlantic Treaty, which set up the NATO military alliance. Although the United States openly disapproved of French efforts to regain control of colonies in Africa and Southeast Asia, it supported the French government in fighting the Communist uprising in French Indochina. However, in 1954, U.S. President Dwight D. Eisenhower declined French requests for aerial strikes to relieve besieged French forces at Dien Bien Phu.

France somewhat reluctantly joined the American leadership in the Cold War to contain the Soviet Union, despite a large Communist presence in French politics. The Communists were kept out of the national government.

A major crisis came in 1956 when France, Britain, and Israel attacked Egypt, which had recently nationalized the Suez Canal. Eisenhower forced them to withdraw. By exposing their diminished international stature, the Suez Crisis had a profound impact on the UK and France: the UK subsequently aligned its Middle East policy to that of the United States, whereas France distanced itself from what it considered to be unreliable allies and sought its own path.

De Gaulle

In the 1950s France sought American help in developing nuclear weapons; Eisenhower rejected the overtures for four reasons. Before 1958, he was troubled by the political instability of the French Fourth Republic and worried that it might use nuclear weapons in its colonial wars in Vietnam and Algeria. Charles de Gaulle brought stability to the Fifth Republic starting in 1958, but Eisenhower was still hesitant to assist in the nuclearization of France. De Gaulle wanted to challenge the Anglo-Saxon monopoly on Western weapons by having his own Force de frappe. Eisenhower feared his grandiose plans to use the bombs to restore French grandeur would weaken NATO.  Furthermore, Eisenhower wanted to discourage the proliferation of nuclear arms anywhere.

Charles de Gaulle also quarreled with Washington over the admission of Britain into the European Economic Community. These and other tensions led to de Gaulle's decision in 1966 to withdraw French forces from the integrated military structure of the North Atlantic Treaty Organization and forced it to move its headquarters from Paris to Brussels, Belgium.  De Gaulle's foreign policy was centered on an attempt to limit the power and influence of both superpowers, which would increase France's international prestige in relative terms. De Gaulle hoped to move France from being a follower of the United States to a leading first-world power with a large following among certain non-aligned Third World countries. The nations de Gaulle considered potential participants in this grouping were those in France's traditional spheres of influence, Africa and the Middle East.

The two nations differed over the waging of the Vietnam War, in part because French leaders were convinced that the United States could not win. The recent French experience with the Algerian War of Independence was that it was impossible, in the long run, for a democracy to impose by force a government over a foreign population without considerable manpower and probably the use of unacceptable methods such as torture. The French popular view of the United States worsened at the same period, as it came to be seen as an imperialist power.

1970–1989

Relations improved somewhat after de Gaulle lost power in 1969. Small tensions reappeared intermittently. France, more strongly than any other nation, has seen the European Union as a method of counterbalancing American power, and thus works towards such ends as having the Euro challenge the preeminent position of the United States dollar in global trade and developing a European defense initiative as an alternative to NATO. Overall, the United States had much closer relations with the other large European powers, Great Britain, Germany and Italy. In the 1980s the two nations cooperated on some international matters but disagreed sharply on others, such as Operation El Dorado Canyon and the desirability of a reunified Germany. The Reagan administration did its best efforts to prevent France and other European countries from buying natural gas from Russia, through the construction of the Siberia-Europe pipeline. The European governments, including the French, were undeterred and the pipeline was finally built.

Anti-Americanism

Richard Kuisel, an American scholar, has explored how France partly embraced American consumerism while rejecting much of American values and power.  He writes in 2013:

On the other hand, Kuisel identifies several strong pull effects:

Middle East conflict 
France under President François Mitterrand supported the 1991 Persian Gulf War in Iraq as a major participant under Operation Daguet. The French Assemblee Nationale even took the "unprecedented decision" to place all French forces in the Gulf under United States command for the duration of the war.

9/11

All the left and right wing political elements in France strongly denounced the barbaric acts of the Al-Qaeda terrorists in the 9/11 attack in 2001.  President Jacques Chirac —later known for his frosty relationship with President George W. Bush—ordered the French secret services to collaborate closely with U.S. intelligence, and created Alliance Base in Paris, a joint-intelligence service center charged with enacting the Bush administration's War on Terror.  However, all the political elements rejected the idea of a full-scale war against Islamic radical terrorism. Memories of the Algerian war, and its disastrous impact on French internal affairs, as well as more distant memories of its own failed Indochina/Vietnam war, played a major role. Furthermore, France had a large Islamic population of its own, which Chirac could not afford to alienate.  As a consequence, France refused to support any American military efforts in the Middle East. Numerous works by French novelists and film makers criticized the American efforts to transform the 9/11 terrorist attacks into a justification for war.

Iraq War

In March 2003 France, along with Germany, China, and Russia, opposed the proposed UN resolution that would have authorized a U.S. invasion of Iraq. During the run-up to the war, French foreign minister Dominique de Villepin emerged as a prominent critic of the American Iraq policies. Despite the recurring rifts, the often ambivalent relationship remained formally intact. The United States did not need French help, and instead worked closely with Britain and its other allies.

Angry American talk about boycotting French products in retaliation fizzled out, having little impact beyond the short-lived renaming of French fries as "Freedom fries." Nonetheless, the Iraq war, the attempted boycott, and anti-French sentiments caused a hostile negative counter reaction in Europe.  By 2006, only one American in six considered France an ally of the United States.

The ire of American popular opinion toward France during the run-up to the 2003 Iraq Invasion was primarily due to the fact that France threatened to use its United Nations Security Council veto power to block U.N. resolutions favorable to authorizing military action, and decided not to intervene in Iraq itself (because the French did not believe the reasons given to go to war, such as the supposed link between Saddam Hussein and Al-Qaeda, and the purported weapons of mass destruction to be legitimate). This contributed to the perception of the French as uncooperative and unsympathetic in American popular opinion at the time. This perception was quite strong and persisted despite the fact that France was and had been for some time a major ally in the campaign in Afghanistan (see for example the French forces in Afghanistan) where both nations (among others in the US-led coalition) were dedicated to the removal of the rogue Taliban, and the subsequent stabilization of Afghanistan, a recognized training ground and safe haven for terrorists intent on carrying out attacks in the Western world.

As the Iraq War progressed, and opposition to the Iraq War amongst Americans increased, relations between the two nations began to improve, and Americans' views of France in general also steadily improved over time. In June 2006 the Pew Global Attitudes Project revealed that 52% of Americans had a positive view of France, up from 46% in 2005. Other reports indicate Americans are moving not so much toward favorable views of France as toward ambivalence, and that views toward France have stabilized roughly on par with views toward Russia and China.

Following issues like Hezbollah's rise in Lebanon, Iran's nuclear program and the stalled Israeli-Palestinian peace process, George Bush urged Jacques Chirac and other world leaders to "stand up for peace" in the face of extremism during a meeting in New York on September 19, 2006.

Strong French and American diplomatic cooperation at the United Nations played an important role in the Cedar Revolution, which saw the withdrawal of Syrian troops from Lebanon. France and the United States also worked together (with some tensions) in crafting UN resolution 1701, intended to bring about a ceasefire in the 2006 Israeli–Lebanese conflict.

Sarkozy administration 

Political relations between France and the United States became friendlier after Nicolas Sarkozy was elected President of France in 2007. Sarkozy, who has been called "Sarko the American", has said that he "love[s] America" and that he is "proud of his nickname".

In 2007, Sarkozy delivered a speech before Congress that was seen as a strong affirmation of French–American ties; during the visit, he also met with President George W. Bush as well as senators John McCain and Barack Obama (before they were chosen as presidential candidates).

During the 2008 presidential election, Barack Obama and John McCain also met with Sarkozy in Paris after securing their respective nominations. After receiving Obama in July, Sarkozy was quoted saying "Obama? C'est mon copain", which means "Obama? He's my buddy." Because of their previous acquaintance, relations between the Sarkozy and Obama administrations were expected to be warm.

Since 2008, France has returned to the integrated command of NATO, a decision that has been greatly appreciated by the United States.

In 2011 the two countries were part of the multi-state coalition which launched a military intervention in Libya where they led the alliance and conducted 35% of all NATO strikes.

Hollande administration 

In 2013, France launched a major operation in Mali to free the country from an ad-hoc alliance of terrorists and Azawa rebels. The United States provided France with logistical support for Operation Serval.

After president François Hollande pledged support for military action against Syria, U.S. Secretary of State John Kerry referred to France as "our oldest ally".

On 10 February 2014, Hollande arrived in the U.S. for the first state visit by a French leader in nearly two decades. Obama and Hollande published jointly in the Washington Post and Le Monde:

During his state visit Hollande toured Monticello where he stated, "We were allies in the time of Jefferson and Lafayette. We are still allies today. We were friends at the time of Jefferson and Lafayette and will remain friends forever."

On September 19, 2014, it was announced that France had joined the United States in bombing Islamic State targets in Iraq as a part of the 2014 American intervention in Iraq. United States president, Barack Obama & the Chairman of the Joint Chiefs of Staff, Martin Dempsey, praised Hollande's decision to join the operation: "As one of our oldest and closest allies, France is a strong partner in our efforts against terrorism and we are pleased that French and American service members will once again work together on behalf of our shared security and our shared values." Said Obama.

"the French were our very first ally and they're with us again now." Stated Dempsey, who was visiting the Normandy landing beaches and the Normandy American Cemetery and Memorial with his French counterpart, General Pierre de Villiers.

Macron administration

Trump presidency 2017–2021

View on U.S. as an ally 
Shortly after Donald Trump's election in November 2016, 75 percent of French adults held a negative opinion of him. Most said he would damage U.S.-European relations and threaten world peace. On the French right, half of the supporters of Marine Le Pen, opposed Trump, despite sharing many of his views on immigration, and trade. On 12 July 2017, President Trump visited France as the guest of President Emmanuel Macron. The two leaders discussed issues that included counter-terrorism and the Syrian Civil War, but played down topics where they sharply disagreed, especially trade, immigration and climate change.

In late 2018, Trump ridiculed Macron over nationalism, tariffs, France's World War II defeat, plans for a European army and the French leader's approval ratings. This followed Trump's Armistice Day visit to Paris which was heavily criticized in both France and the United States. In December, Macron criticised Trump over his decision to withdraw US troops from Syria, stating: "To be allies is to fight shoulder to shoulder. It's the most important thing for a head of state and head of the military," and "An Ally Should Be Dependable."

In April 2019, the departing French ambassador to the United States Gérard Araud commented on the Trump administration and the US: "Basically, this president and this administration don't have allies, don't have friends. It's really [about] bilateral relationships on the basis of the balance of power and the defense of narrow American interest... we don't have interlocutors... [When] we have people to talk to, they are acting, so they don't have real authority or access. Basically, the consequence is that there is only one center of power: the White House." On France working with the US: "...We really don't want to enter into a childish confrontation and are trying to work with our most important ally, the most important country in the world."

In November 2019, Macron questioned the U.S. commitment to Europe, stating: "What we are currently experiencing is the brain death of NATO", adding "[NATO] only works if the guarantor of last resort functions as such. I'd argue that we should reassess the reality of what NATO is in the light of the commitment of the United States".

2019 Trade Wars 
In March 2019, at a time when China–U.S. economic relations were engaged in a trade war, Macron and Chinese leader Xi Jinping signed a series of 15 large-scale trade and business agreements totaling 40 billion euros (US$45 billion) which covered many sectors over a period of years. The centerpiece was a €30 billion purchase of airplanes from Airbus. The new trade agreements also covered French chicken exports, a French-built offshore wind farm in China, a Franco-Chinese cooperation fund, billions of Euros of co-financing between BNP Paribas and the Bank of China, billions of euros to be spent on modernizing Chinese factories, and new ship building.

In July, Trump threatened tariffs against France in retaliation for France enacting a digital services tax against multinational firms. With Trump tweeting, "France just put a digital tax on our great American technology companies. If anybody taxes them, it should be their home Country, the USA. We will announce a substantial reciprocal action on Macron's foolishness shortly. I've always said American wine is better than French wine!"

French Finance Minister Bruno Le Maire indicated France would follow through with its digital tax plans. French Agriculture Minister Didier Guillaume responded on French TV, "It's absurd, in terms of having a political and economic debate, to say that if you tax the 'GAFAs', I'll tax wine. It's completely moronic."

After Trump again indicated his intentions to impose taxes on French wine over France's digital tax plans, President of the European Council Donald Tusk stated the European Union would support France and impose retaliatory tariffs on the US. In December 2019, the U.S. government stated that it might impose tariffs up to 100% on $2.4 billion in imports from France of Champagne, handbags, cheese and other products, after reaching the conclusion that France's digital services tax would be detrimental to U.S. tech companies.

Biden presidency 2021–present

On 17 September 2021, France recalled Philippe Étienne, the French ambassador to the U.S., and Jean-Pierre Thébault, the French ambassador to Australia after the formation of the AUKUS defence technology between the U.S., Australia and UK (from which France was excluded). As part of the new security agreement, the U.S. will provide nuclear-powered submarines to the Royal Australian Navy, and Australia canceled a US$66 billion deal from 2016 to purchase twelve French-built conventionally powered (diesel) submarines. The French government was furious at the cancellation of the submarine agreement and said that it had been blindsided, calling the decision a "stab in the back". On 22 September, President Joe Biden and Macron pledged to improve the relationship between the two countries. Étienne returned to the United States on 30 September.

However relations improved sharply in early 2022, as France worked closely with the U.S. and NATO in helping Ukraine and punishing Russia for its invasion. The overall relations with the U.S. became an issue in the April 2022 presidential election, as the right-wing candidate Marine Le Pen denounced close ties with the United States and NATO while promising a rapprochement with Russia. According to the New York Times: As Russia's war in Ukraine rages on, Ms. Le Pen effectively signaled that her election would terminate or at least disrupt President Biden's united alliance in confronting President Vladimir V. Putin of Russia, and perhaps create a breach in Western Europe for Mr. Putin to exploit.  Dismissing multilateralism, blasting Germany, criticizing the European Union, relegating climate issues to a low priority, attacking "globalists" and maintaining a near silence on Russia's brutal assault in Ukraine, Ms. Le Pen gave a taste of a worldview that was at once reminiscent of the Trump presidency and appeared to directly threaten NATO’s attempts to arm Ukraine and defeat Russia.Relations further improved during Macron's visit to the U.S. in December 2022, during which he and President Biden reaffirmed the cooperation and friendship between the two countries. They also discussed the war in Ukraine and economic issues.

Resident diplomatic missions

Resident diplomatic missions of France in the United States
 Washington, D.C. (Embassy)
 Atlanta (Consulate-General)
 Boston (Consulate-General)
 Chicago (Consulate-General)
 Houston (Consulate-General)
 Los Angeles (Consulate-General)
 Miami (Consulate-General)
 New Orleans (Consulate-General)
 New York City (Consulate-General)
 San Francisco (Consulate-General)

Resident diplomatic missions of the United States in France
 Paris (Embassy)
 Marseille (Consulate-General)
 Strasbourg (Consulate-General)
 Bordeaux (American Presence Post)
 Lyon (American Presence Post)
 Rennes (American Presence Post)

See also
 Anti-Americanism
 Foreign relations of France
 Foreign relations of the United States
 Francophile
 Francophobia
 French American
 Freedom fries
 US–EU relations
 European Union–NATO relations

References

Diplomacy and politics

 Bailey, Thomas A. A Diplomatic History of the American People (10th edition 1980) online.
 Banholzer, Simon, and Tobias Straumann. "Why the French Said ‘Non’: A New Perspective on the Hoover Moratorium of June 1931." Journal of Contemporary History 56.4 (2021): 1040-1060.
 Belkin, Paul. France: Factors shaping foreign policy and issues in US-French relations (Diane Publishing, 2012).
 Blackburn, George M. French Newspaper Opinion on the American Civil War (1997) 
 Blumenthal, Henry. A Reappraisal of Franco-American Relations, 1830-1871 (1959).
 Blumenthal, Henry. France and the United States: Their Diplomatic Relations, 1789–1914 (1979) online
 Blumenthal, Henry. Illusion and Reality in Franco-American Diplomacy, 1914–1945 (1986) 
 Bowman, Albert H. The Struggle for Neutrality: Franco-American Diplomacy during the Federalist Era (1974), on 1790s.
 Bozo, Frédéric. "'Winners' and 'Losers': France, the United States, and the End of the Cold War," Diplomatic History Nov. 2009, Volume 33, Issue 5, pages 927–956, 
 Bozo, Frédéric. Two strategies for Europe: De Gaulle, the United States, and the Atlantic Alliance (2001) online
 Brogi, Alessandro. Confronting America: the cold war between the United States and the communists in France and Italy (2011).
 Brookhiser, Richard. "France and Us." American Heritage (Aug/Sep 2003) 54#4 pp 28–33. wide-ranging survey over 250 years
 Bruce, Robert B. "America Embraces France: Marshal Joseph Joffre and the French Mission to the United States, April–May 1917." Journal of Military History 66.2 (2002): 407+.
 Bush, Robert D. The Louisiana Purchase: A Global Context (2013).
 Case, Lynn Marshall, and Warren F. Spencer. The United States and France: Civil War Diplomacy (1970) online
 Cogan, Charles. Oldest Allies, Guarded Friends: The United States and France Since 1940 (1994)
 Costigliola, Frank. France and the United States: the cold alliance since World War II (1992), Scholarly history.
 Creswell, Michael. A Question of Balance: How France and the United States Created Cold War Europe (Harvard Historical Studies) (2006)  excerpt and text search
 Dallek,  Robert. Franklin D. Roosevelt and American Foreign Policy, 1932-1945 (1979) pp 635–636. online
 Druelle, Clotilde. Feeding Occupied France During World War I: Herbert Hoover and the Blockade (Springer, 2019) Hoover is most famous re Belgium but he also fed the part of France occupied by Germany.
 Duroselle, Jean-Baptiste. "Relations between Two Peoples: The Singular Example of the United States and France," Review of Politics (1979) 41#4 pp. 483–500 in JSTOR, by leading French diplomatic historian
 Duroselle, Jean-Baptiste. France and the United States from the beginnings to the present (1978) online 
 Gravelle, Timothy B., Jason Reifler, and Thomas J. Scotto. "The structure of foreign policy attitudes in transatlantic perspective: Comparing the United States, United Kingdom, France and Germany." European Journal of Political Research 56.4 (2017): 757-776. online 
 Greenhalgh, Elizabeth. "The Viviani-Joffre Mission to the United States, April–May 1917: A Reassessment." French Historical Studies 35.4 (2012): 627–659.
 Guisnel, Jean. Les Pires Amis du monde: Les relations franco-américaines à la fin du XXe siècle (Paris, 1999), in French
 Haglund, David G. ed. The France-US Leadership Race: Closely Watched Allies (2000)
 Haglund, David G. "Theodore Roosevelt and the 'Special Relationship' with France." in A Companion to Theodore Roosevelt (2011): pp 329–349.
 Haglund, David G. "Roosevelt as "Friend of France"—But Which One?" Diplomatic history 31.5 (2007): 883-908. online; French admired Theodore Roosevelt much more highly than FDR.
 Haglund, David G.  "That Other Transatlantic "Great Rapprochement":  France, the United States, and Theodore Roosevelt" in Hans Krabbendam and John Thompson eds. America's Transatlantic Turn (Palgrave Macmillan, New York, 2012) pp. 103–120.
 Haglund, David G. "Devant L'Empire: France and the Question of 'American Empire,' from Theodore Roosevelt to George W. Bush." Diplomacy & Statecraft 19.4 (2008): 746–766.
 Haglund, David G. "Happy days are here again? France's reintegration into NATO and its impact on relations with the USA." European security 19.1 (2010): 123–142.
 Hill, Peter P. Napoleon's Troublesome Americans: Franco-American Relations, 1804-1815 (2005). online 
 Hoffman, Ronald and Peter J. Albert, eds. Diplomacy and Revolution: The Franco-American Alliance of 1778 (1981), Topical essays by scholars.
 Kaplan, Lawrence S. "Jefferson, the Napoleonic Wars, and the Balance of Power." William and Mary Quarterly 14#2 (1957), pp. 196–217, online
 King, Richard Carl, "Review of the historiography of Franco-American relations from 1828-1860" (1972). (U. of Montana Graduate Student Theses, Dissertations, & Professional Papers. 5199) online
 Krige, John. "Technodiplomacy: A concept and its application to US-France nuclear weapons cooperation in the Nixon-Kissinger era." Federal History 12 (2020): 99–116. online .
 Leffler, Melvyn. The Elusive Quest: America's Pursuit of European Stability and French Security, 1919-1933 (1979
 Leffler, Melvyn P. "The struggle for stability: American policy toward France, 1921-1933" (PhD thesis, The Ohio State University, 1972). 695pp. full text online
 Lewis, Tom Tandy. "Franco-American diplomatic relations, 1898-1907" (PhD dissertation, U of Oklahoma, 1970) online.
 McKay, Donald C. The United States and France (Harvard University Press, 1951)
 McLaughlin, Sean J. JFK and de Gaulle: How America and France Failed in Vietnam, 1961-1963 (UP of Kentucky, 2019) DOI:10.5810/kentucky/9780813177748.001.0 
 Marshall, Bill, ed. France and the Americas: culture, politics, and history: a multidisciplinary encyclopedia (3 vol, ABC-CLIO, 2005). excerpt
 Matera, Paulina. "The Question of War Debts and Reparations in French-American Relations after WWI." Humanities and Social Sciences 21.23 (2) (2016): 133–143. online
 Meunier, Sophie. "Is France Still Relevant?." French Politics, Culture & Society 35.2 (2017): 59–75.
 Morris, Richard B. The Peacemakers; the Great Powers and American Independence (1965), the standard scholarly history; online
 Morris, Richard B.  "The Great Peace of 1783," Massachusetts Historical Society Proceedings (1983) Vol. 95, pp 29–51, a summary of his long book in JSTOR
 Néré, Jacques. The foreign policy of France from 1914 to 1945 (Island Press, 2002).
 Noble, George. Policies and opinions at Paris, 1919: Wilsonian diplomacy, the Versailles Peace, and French public opinion (1968).
 Pagedas, Constantine A. Anglo-American Strategic Relations and the French Problem, 1960-1963: A Troubled Partnership (2000).
 Paxton, Robert O., ed. De Gaulle and the United States (1994)
 Piller, Elisabeth Marie. "The Transatlantic Dynamics of European Cultural Diplomacy: Germany, France and the Battle for US Affections in the 1920s." Contemporary European History 30.2 (2021): 248–264.
 Reyn, Sebastian. Atlantis Lost: The American Experience with De Gaulle, 1958–1969 (2011) excerpt
 Savelle, Max. The Origins of American Diplomacy: The International History of Angloamerica, 1492–1763 (New York and London: Collier-Macmillan and the Macmillan Company, 1967) online 
 Sainlaude Stève, France and the American Civil War: a diplomatic history (2019) DOI:10.5149/northcarolina/9781469649948.001.0001
 Sainlaude Stève, France and the Confederacy (1861–1865), Paris, L'Harmattan, 2011
 Seymour, James William Davenport, ed. History of the American Field Service in France: Friends of France, 1914-1917 (1920) online.
 Statler, Kathryn C.  Replacing France: The Origins of American Intervention in Vietnam (2007)
 Stinchcombe, William C. The American Revolution and the French Alliance (1969) online
 Taylor, Jordan E. "The reign of error: North American information politics and the French revolution, 1789–1795." Journal of the Early Republic 39.3 (2019): 437–466.
 Verdier, Daniel. Democracy and international trade: Britain, France, and the United States, 1860-1990 (Princeton UP, 2021).
 Wall, Irwin M. The United States and the Making of Postwar France, 1945-1954 (1991).
 Wall, Irwin M. France, the United States, and the Algerian War (2001). online in French
 White, Elizabeth Brett. American opinion of France from Lafayette to Poincaré (1927) online
 Whitridge, Arnold. "Gouverneur Morris in France." History Today (Nov 1972), pp 759–767 online; on 1792-1794
 Williams, Andrew J. France, Britain and the United States in the Twentieth Century 1900–1940 (2014). 133–171.
 
 Willson, Beckles. America's Ambassadors to France (1777-1927): A Narrative of Franco-American Diplomatic Relations (1928). online
 Young, Robert J. Marketing Marianne : French propaganda in America, 1900-1940 (2004) online
 Young, Robert. An American by Degrees: The Extraordinary Lives of French Ambassador Jules Jusserand (McGill-Queen's University Press, 2009). excerpt, A standard scholarly biography
 Zahniser, Marvin R. "The French Connection: Thirty Years of French-American Relations," Reviews in American History (1987) 15#3 pp. 486–492 in JSTOR reviews books by Blumenthal (1986) and Hurstfield (1986)
 Zahniser, Marvin R. Uncertain friendship: American-French diplomatic relations through the cold war (1975). online; a standard scholarly survey
 Zahniser, Marvin R. Then came disaster: France and the United States, 1918-1940 (2002) online

World War II
 Berthon, Simon.  Allies at War: The Bitter Rivalry among Churchill, Roosevelt, and de Gaulle. (2001). 356 pp. online 
 Blumenthal, Henry. Illusion and Reality in Franco-American Diplomacy, 1914–1945 (1986)
 Cogan, Charles. Oldest Allies, Guarded Friends: The United States and France Since 1940 (1994)
 Haglund, David G, "Roosevelt as 'Friend of France'—But Which One?" Diplomatic History 31#5 (2007), pp. 883–907 online
 Hurstfield, Julian G. America and the French Nation, 1939–1945 (1986).  replaces Langer's 1947 study of FDR & Vichy France 
 Langer, William L.  Our Vichy Gamble (1947), defends FDR's policy 1940-42
 McVickar Haight Jr, John. "Roosevelt as Friend of France" Foreign Affairs 44#3 (1966), pp. 518–526 online
 Viorst, Milton.  Hostile Allies: FDR and Charles De Gaulle (1965)
 Williams, Andrew J. France, Britain and the United States in the Twentieth Century 1900–1940 (2014). pp 133–171.
 Zahniser, Marvin R. "Rethinking the Significance of Disaster: The United States and the Fall of France in 1940" International History Review 14#2 (1992), pp. 252–276 online

Cultural and economic relationships

 Blumenthal, Henry. American and French Culture, 1800-1900: Interchanges in Art, Science, Literature, and Society (1976). online
 Brogi, Alessandro. Confronting America: The Cold War between the United States and the Communists in France and Italy (2011) DOI:10.5149/9780807877746_brogi
 Clarke, Jackie. "France, America and the metanarrative of modernization: From postwar social science to the new culturalism." Contemporary French and Francophone Studies 8.4 (2004): 365–377.
 Conover, Harvey, and Frances Conover Church. Diary of a WWI Pilot: Ambulances, Planes, and Friends: Harvey Conover's Adventures in France, 1917-1918 (Conover-Patterson Publishers, 2004) online.
 Covo, Manuel. "Baltimore and the French Atlantic: Empires, Commerce, and Identity in a Revolutionary Age, 1783–1798." in The Caribbean and the Atlantic World Economy (Palgrave Macmillan, London, 2015) pp. 87–107.
 Feigenbaum, Gail, ed. Jefferson's America & Napoleon's France : an exhibition for the Louisiana Purchase Bicentennial (2003) online
 Gagnon, Paul A. "French Views of the Second American Revolution" French Historical Studies 2#4 (1962), pp. 430–449, regarding Ford & industry in 1920s; online
 Harison, Casey. "The French Revolution on Film: American and French Perspectives." History Teacher 38.3 (2005): 299–324. online
 Hultquist, Clark Eric. "Americans in Paris: The J. Walter Thompson Company in France, 1927–1968." Enterprise and Society 4#3 (2003): 471–501; impact of American advertising industry.
 Jackson, Jeffrey H. "Making Jazz French: the reception of jazz music in Paris, 1927-1934." French Historical Studies 25.1 (2002): 149–170. online 
 Jones, Howard Mumford. America and French Culture, 1750-1848 (U of North Carolina Press, 1927). online
 Kenney, William H. "Le hot: the assimilation of American jazz in France, 1917-1940." American Studies 25.1 (1984): 5-24. online
 Kuisel, Richard F. Seducing the French: the dilemma of Americanization (U of California Press, 1993).
 Levenstein, Harvey. Seductive journey: American tourists in France from Jefferson to the Jazz Age  (1998) online
 Levenstein, Harvey. We'll Always Have Paris: American Tourists in France since 1930 (2004) DOI:10.7208/chicago/9780226473802.001.0001
 Low, Betty-Bright P. France views America, 1765-1815: an exhibition to commemorate the bicentenary of French assistance in the American War of Independence (1978); how French saw USA online
 McCullough, David. The Greater Journey: Americans in Paris, (Simon & Schuster, 2011) online.
 Marshall, Bill, ed. France and the Americas: culture, politics, and history: a multidisciplinary encyclopedia (3 vol, ABC-CLIO, 2005). excerpt
 Marzagalli, Silvia. "The failure of a transatlantic alliance? Franco-American trade, 1783–1815." History of European Ideas 34.4 (2008): 456–464.
 Marzagalli, Silvia. "Establishing transatlantic trade networks in time of war: Bordeaux and the United States, 1793–1815." Business History Review 79.4 (2005): 811–844.
 Miller, John J., and Mark Molesky. Our oldest enemy: A history of America's disastrous relationship with France (Broadway Books, 2007).
 Potofsky, Allan. "The Political Economy of the French-American Debt Debate: The Ideological Uses of Atlantic Commerce, 1787 to 1800." William and Mary Quarterly 63.3 (2006): 489–516. online
 Quintero, Diana. "American Television and Cinema in France and Europe." Fletcher Forum World Affairs. 18 (1994): 115. online
 Roger, Philippe. "Cassandra's policies: French prophecies of an American empire from the Civil War to the Cold War." Journal of European Studies 38.2 (2008): 101–120.
 Shields-Argeles, Christy. "Imagining Self and the Other: food and identity in France and the United States." Food, Culture & Society 7.2 (2004): 13–28.
 Vines, Lois Davis. "Recent Astérix: Franco-American Relations and Globalization." Contemporary French Civilization 34.1 (2010): 203–224.
 Walton, Whitney. Internationalism, National Identities, and Study Abroad: France and the United States, 1890-1970 (2009) DOI:10.11126/stanford/9780804762533.001.0001
 Walton, Whitney. "National interests and cultural exchange in French and American educational travel, 1914–1970." Journal of Transatlantic Studies 13.4 (2015): 344–357.
 Whitfield, Stephen J. "A Century and a half of French Views of the United States." Historian 56.3 (1994): 531–542.
 Ziesche, Philipp. Cosmopolitan patriots: Americans in Paris in the age of revolution (2010) regarding 1790s online

Anti-Americanism
 Armus, Seth D. French Anti-Americanism (1930-1948): Critical Moments in a Complex History (2007)  179pp. 
 Boyce, Robert. "When "Uncle Sam" became 'Uncle Shylock': Sources and Strength of French Anti-Americanism, 1919–1932," Histoire@Politique (April 2013) No. 19 online in English
 
 Echeverria, Durand. Mirage in the West: A History of the French Image of American Society to 1815 (Princeton UP, 1957) online
 Kennedy, Sean. "André Siegfried and the Complexities of French Anti-Americanism." French Politics, Culture & Society (2009): 1-22. in JSTOR
 Kuisel, Richard F. The French Way: How France Embraced and Rejected American Values and Power (Princeton University Press, 2013) online
 Lacorne, Denis, et al. eds. The Rise and Fall of Anti-Americanism: A Century of French Perception (Palgrave Macmillan, 1990) 18 essays by French scholars in English translation.
 Lacorne, Denis. "Anti-Americanism and Americanophobia: A French Perspective" (2005) online; also in Denis Lacorne and Tony Judt, eds. With Us or Against Us: Studies in Global Anti-Americanism (2007) pp 35–58
 Matsumoto, Reiji. "From Model to Menace: French Intellectuals and American Civilization." The Japanese Journal of American Studies 15 (2004): 163–85. online
 Meunier, Sophie. "Anti-Americanisms in France." French politics, culture & society 23.2 (2005): 126–141.
 Miller, John J., and Mark Molesky. Our oldest enemy: A history of America's disastrous relationship with France (Broadway Books, 2007). online
Pells, Richard. Not like Us: How Europeans Have Loved, Hated and Transformed American Culture since World War  II (1997) online
 Ray, Leonard. "Anti-Americanism and left-right ideology in France." French Politics 9.3 (2011): 201–221.
 Roger, Philippe.  The American Enemy: the history of French anti-Americanism (U of Chicago Press, 2005) excerpt and text search
 Rolls, Alistair, and Deborah Walker. French and American noir: dark crossings (2009).
 Sancton, Tom. Sweet Land of Liberty: America in the Mind of the French Left, 1848-1871 (Louisiana State University Press, 2021) online review; argues French discussions reflected French beliefs rather than accurate portrayals of America.
 
 
 Timmerman, Kenneth R. The French betrayal of America (2004), focus on late 20th century online
 Unger, Harlow G. The French war against America : how a trusted ally betrayed Washington and the founding fathers (2005); focus on late 18th century online
 Verhoeven, Tim. "Shadow and Light: Louis-Xavier Eyma (1816–76) and French Opinion of the United States during the Second Empire." International History Review 35.1 (2013): 143–161.
 Willging, Jennifer. "Of GMOs, McDomination and foreign fat: contemporary Franco-American food fights." French Cultural Studies 19.2 (2008): 199–226.

In French
 François, Stéphane. "«US go home» Critique de la modernité libérale et américanophobie." Octobre 2017 (2017). online
 Fuks, Jennifer. "L'anti-américanisme au sein de la gauche socialiste française: de la libération aux années 2000." in L'anti-américanisme au sein de la gauche socialiste francaise (2010): 1–237.
 Hamel, Yan. "Scènes de la vie (anti) américaine. Autour de La putain respectueuse de Jean-Paul Sartre." Études littéraires 39.2 (2008): 99–112. online
 Revel, Jean François.  L'Obsession anti-américaine: Son fonctionnement, ses causes, ses inconséquences (Paris, 2002)
 Rigoulot, Pierre. L Antiaméricanisme: Critique d'un prêt-à-penser rétrograde et chauvin (Paris, 2004)
 Roger, Philippe. L'Ennemi américain: Généalogie de 1'antiaméricanisme français (Paris, 2002)

External links
Interview with U.S. Ambassador to France from the Dean Peter Krogh Foreign Affairs Digital Archives
 History of France – U.S. relations
 French Negotiating Style U.S. Institute of Peace Special Report, April 2001
 U.S.-France Relations (1763 – present) Council on Foreign Relations
 A short history of Franco-US discord Le Monde diplomatique, English edition March 2003
 History, Economic ties, culture... French Embassy in the US – French-American relations page.
Detailed chronicle on American Francophobia

 
United States
Bilateral relations of the United States
Relations of colonizer and former colony